The Raw Air 2019 is the third edition of Raw Air for men, a ten-day tournament for men in ski jumping and ski flying held across Norway between 8–17 March 2019; and the 2nd edition for women, a six-day tournament in ski jumping held across Norway between 9–14 March 2020. It is part of the 2019/20 World Cup season.

Competition format 
The competition is held on four different hills for men Oslo, Lillehammer, Trondheim and Vikersund; and on three hills without Vikersund for women. It lasts for ten consecutive days with a total of 16 rounds from individual events, team events and qualifications (prologues) for men; and for six consecutive days with total of 9 rounds from individual events and qualifications (prologues) for women.

Men

Women

Schedule

Map of hosts 

 Men & Women
 Men only

Men

Women

Men's team

References 

2019
2019 in ski jumping
2019 in Norwegian sport
March 2019 sports events in Europe